Laurent Gamelon (born 19 June 1960) is a French actor.

Filmography

Theater

References

External links 

French male film actors
Living people
20th-century French male actors
21st-century French male actors
French male stage actors
French male television actors
1960 births
People from Boulogne-Billancourt